Questa è la mia terra is an Italian television series. The second season title was Questa è la mia terra - Vent'anni dopo.

Cast

Kasia Smutniak: Giulia Corradi
Roberto Farnesi: Andrea Acciari
Massimo Poggio: Giacomo De Santis
Massimo Ciavarro: Giuseppe Aiello
Cristina Moglia: Bianca Corradi
Myriam Catania: Silvana Corradi

See also
List of Italian television series

External links
 

Italian television series
2006 Italian television series debuts
2008 Italian television series endings
Canale 5 original programming